Paroli is a late 17th-century French gambling card game.

Paroli may also refer to:
 PAROLI, a proprietary protocol used inside a multi-shelf Carrier Routing System from Cisco

People 
 Adriano Paroli (born 1962), an Italian politician and lawyer
 Giovanni Paroli (1856–1920), an Italian operatic tenor  
 Julienne Paroli (1882–1959), a French film actress
 Orfeo Paroli (1906–1980), an Italian rower